The Donek is a Turkish breed of fancy pigeon developed over many years of selective breeding. The name Donek is of Turkish language origin and means, "turning and dropping down from the sky." The Donek, along with other varieties of domesticated pigeons, are all descendants from the rock pigeon (Columba livia).
The breed is known for its aerial acrobatics (spiral diving) and as such is more of a performance breed rather than a purely fancy variety. Their aerial spiraling return when called back to the loft makes a spectacular sight.

See also 
List of pigeon breeds

References

Pigeon breeds
Pigeonbreeds originating in North Macedonia